Chrysiogenaceae is a family of bacteria.

Phylogeny
The phylogeny is based on 16S rRNA based LTP_12_2021

See also
 List of bacterial orders
 List of bacteria genera

References

Bacteria families
Chrysiogenetes